This is a list of Maccabiah Games karate medals.

16th Maccabiah Games, 2001

17th Maccabiah Games, 2005

18th Maccabiah Games, 2009

References

Maccabiah Games medalists
Karate